The Port of Whitman County is a port authority in Whitman County in the U.S. state of Washington. It operates Port of Wilma on the Snake River near the Idaho state line, where it owned a grain elevator as of 1996. The port authority was created by voters in 1958.

Tenants
Schweitzer Engineering Laboratories manufacturing has been located at the Port's Pullman Industrial Park in Pullman, Washington since 1988.

References

External links

1958 establishments in Washington (state)
Ports and harbors of Washington (state)
Whitman County, Washington